Zebastian Lucky Luisi (born 22 December 1984), also known by the nicknames of "Lucky", "Zeb", "Zebba", is a New Zealand rugby league footballer who has competed in the Auckland Rugby League competition, his most recent club being the Howick Hornets. He has also represented the Otahuhu Leopards. Luisi has also represent Niue in international rugby league.

Background
Luisi was born in Auckland, New Zealand.

Early years
Luisi is a Junior Kiwi international. Luisi is of Māori and Niuean descent and previously played for the Eastern Tornadoes in the Bartercard Cup, the top level rugby league competition in New Zealand.

England
Zebastian Lucky Luisi joined London Broncos on a 2-year contract at the end of 2004's Super League IX after putting together some impressive performances on trial with the club during that season. The big full-back was selected to play for the Harlequins rugby union side for the Middlesex Sevens at Twickenham Stadium.

Lucky Luisi played for Doncaster in National League Two having signed in February 2008 from Harlequins RL. At the start of the 2009 Season he joined championship club Barrow Raiders

Return to New Zealand
He returned home in 2012, joining the Otahuhu Leopards in the Auckland Rugby League competition. In 2013 and 2014 he is the player-coach of the Howick Hornets. He played for the Counties Manukau Stingrays in the 2013 National Competition.

Niue 
Also, on 27 October, he played in a 36–32 loss against Italy. In this match, he scored his first try for the Niuean national team.

References

External links

Barrow Raiders profile
Harlequins RL Profile

1984 births
Living people
Barrow Raiders players
Counties Manukau rugby league team players
Doncaster R.L.F.C. players
Eastern Tornadoes players
Howick Hornets coaches
Howick Hornets players
London Broncos players
New Zealand Māori rugby league players
New Zealand Māori rugby league team players
New Zealand people of Niuean descent
New Zealand rugby league coaches
New Zealand rugby league players
New Zealand expatriate sportspeople in England
Niue national rugby league team captains
Niue national rugby league team players
Otahuhu Leopards players
Rugby league centres
Rugby league fullbacks
Rugby league wingers